The men's 400 metres hurdles event at the 1991 Summer Universiade was held at the Don Valley Stadium in Sheffield on 23 and 24 July 1991.

Medalists

Results

Heats

Final

References

Athletics at the 1991 Summer Universiade
1991